Blues Cruise is an album by jazz saxophonist Chris Cheek. It was released by Fresh Sound New Talent.

Background
Cheek had released three albums for Fresh Sound New Talent before this one. In addition to Cheek on saxophones, the Brad Mehldau trio were the other musicians.

Music and recording
The album was recorded at Avatar Studios, New York City, on March 16 and 17, 2005. Mehldau plays Fender Rhodes on some tracks.

Reception

The JazzTimes reviewer wrote that "The group strikes an appealing middle ground between old-school and modernist interpretative styles." The Penguin Guide to Jazz described the album as containing "measured thinking, unexpected and slippery development, and a taste for the macabre."

Track listing
"Flamingo" (Grouya-Anderson) – 5:23
"Low Key Lightly" (Ellington) – 6:36
"Coo" (Cheek) – 6:49
"Squirrelling" (Cheek) – 5:42
"Song of India" (Korsakov) – 3:47
"Falling" (Cheek) – 6:19
"Blues Cruise" (Cheek) – 7:43
"John Denver" (Cheek) – 6:05
"The Sweatheart Tree" (Mancini) – 5:08

Personnel
 Chris Cheek – tenor sax, soprano sax
 Brad Mehldau – piano, Fender Rhodes
 Larry Grenadier – bass
 Jorge Rossy – drums

References

Chris Cheek albums
2005 albums